Goran Marinković (Serbian Cyrillic: Горан Маринковић, born January 8, 1979) is a Serbian football midfielder.

After playing with Serbian clubs FK Solunac Karađorđevo, FK Spartak Subotica, FK Hajduk Kula, FK Radnički Bajmok and FK Mladost Apatin, he had a 6 months spelt in China with Qingdao Hailifeng F.C., and another half season in Sweden with Ljungskile SK, before returning to Serbia to play with FK Zlatibor Voda, Spartak Subotica again and FK Sloga Kraljevo. Since January 2010 he has been playing with Montenegrin club OFK Petrovac.

External links
 Profile and stats at Srbijafudbal
 Early career at Dekisa.Tripod
 Hajduk Kula squad with players previous clubs at EUFO
 OFK Petrovac 2009-10 squad at club official site

1979 births
Living people
Sportspeople from Subotica
Serbian footballers
Serbian expatriate footballers
FK Spartak Subotica players
FK Hajduk Kula players
FK Mladost Apatin players
FK Sloga Kraljevo players
Ljungskile SK players
Expatriate footballers in Sweden
Expatriate footballers in China
China League One players
OFK Petrovac players
Association football midfielders